Graveyard Carz is an American automotive reality TV show made on location in Springfield, Oregon that restores late 1960s/early 1970s Mopar muscle cars. The Graveyard Carz shop motto: "It's Mopar or No Car".
As of July 28, 2020, the show is in production for a 15th season on Motortrend, formerly Velocity.

The show
Graveyard Carz was created and is owned by Mark Worman. It is produced independently by The Division, a film and television production company in which Worman is also the CEO. The show's relationship with Velocity is what is called "a pre-sale acquisition." The Division retains all creative control but frequently takes notes and suggestions from the Velocity team.

In 2016 TERN commissioned and acquired the global rights for 26 episodes of Graveyard Carz in HFR UHD. These episodes will be aired on Velocity in HD as Season 6 and elsewhere by Insight as Season 6 and Season 7.

The 1971 Phantom 'Cuda
Mark Worman wanted to document the restoration of a 1971 Plymouth 'Cuda, painted Hemi Orange, equipped with a 440 6 Barrel V8, a Heavy Duty 4-Speed manual transmission, and a 3.54 ratio Dana 60 rear axle. On July 5, 1980, the car was wrecked after the driver lost control in a 100 mph race with a pickup truck. After acquiring the car, Worman entered into an agreement with a collector to have the car restored.

To prove to nay-sayers that the car could be restored, Mark had the son of local friend (Aaron Smith) film the restoration. After seeing how entertaining the team was, Worman and Smith decided to start shooting concept material for a television pilot, and Graveyard Carz was born.

Over the course of the first five seasons, viewers have seen The Phantom 'Cuda undergo a slow transformation. In Season 1 it was dipped in a paint stripping tank, while its overall condition was assessed in Season 2. Season 3 saw the repair of a fender to determine if the sheet metal was too compromised to use in the restoration. At the end of Season 4, the 'Cuda was shipped off to American Metal Direct (AMD), an automobile and truck replacement parts retailer for installation. The car returned in Season 5 with all brand new sheet metal. In Season 6 The Phantom 'Cuda is completed, restored to factory condition.

Cast (The Ghouls)
The first four seasons of Graveyard Carz featured Mark Worman, Royal Yoakum, Josh Rose, and Daren Kirkpatrick. Seasons 2 and 3 featured recurring cast member Holly Chedester, who did not return for Season 4.

Season 5 (previously titled Season 4b) brought back Mark Worman's daughter Allysa Rose, a recurring cast member in Season 1 (and married to fellow cast member Josh Rose), Worman's best friend Royal Yoakum, and introduced Will Scott, a vehicle painter (who had been part of the original concept for the series) as well as new mechanic/assembly technician and long-time fan of the show David Rea.

Production
Currently, a 13-episode season takes about 100 days of continuous shooting. Earlier seasons took more than a year, as the original crew would only work Saturdays on Mopar builds. True to the show's premise, the current cast are actual automotive technicians, and the film crew plans series shoots around the elements of key car builds.

Once a car is completed, if its owners are willing, a shoot is planned to see the car "revealed" to them. The film crew takes extra care to make the "reveal" as true to life as possible.

Due to the nature of how quickly the show must be produced, and how long it actually takes to build a car, the episodes are edited parallel with the filming. Therefore, each episode doesn't have a typical car show reveal, but instead, emphasis is placed on the smaller yet significant sub-assembly builds needed on a car.

Comedic storylines are often shot separately, away from the actual car work being done. Therefore, every effort is made to place them in episodes as close to when they occurred in real time in order to avoid continuity issues. Despite popular belief, most comedic storylines are claimed to be 100% true, depicting events that have happened in the shop. The cast is encouraged to let the film crew in on any pranks to best capture real reactions.

Season 6 Revamp
Graveyard Carz went through a total revamp: new logo, new graphics, and new show format built upon the changes made in Season 5. Rather than focusing on the cast and their daily activities, focus has shifted to the cars and their builds in order to draw in viewers disheartened by the original format of the show.

Episodes

Season 1
Season one started on June 14, 2012, and ended on July 19, 2012, for a total of 6 episodes.

Season 2
Season two started on January 8, 2013, and ended on April 2, 2013, for a total of 13 episodes.

Season 3
Season three started on January 7, 2014, and ended on April 1, 2014, for a total of 13 episodes. Starting with the second episode, the series now includes trivia questions before and after the commercial breaks and recaps of what has taken place up to that point. A new opening title sequence also debuted on the second episode of the season.

Season 4
Season four started on November 18.

Season 5
Season Five with new cast and new shop.

Season 6
Season six started on November 2, 2016.

Season 7
Season Seven started on March 20, 2017.

Season 8
Season 8 started on November 14, 2017.

Season 9
Season 9 began on March 6, 2018.

Season 10
Season 10 began on November 30, 2018.

Season 11
Season 11 began on December 6, 2019.

Season 12
Season 12 began on May 26, 2020.

Season 13
Season 13 began on March 16, 2021.

See also
 American Chopper
 American Hot Rod
 Overhaulin'

References

External links
 
 The Division Productions website

Automotive television series
Vehicle modification media
Motor Trend (TV network) original programming
2010s American reality television series
2012 American television series debuts
Television shows set in Oregon
Springfield, Oregon
Chrysler
2020s American reality television series